In mathematics, the Lyusternik–Schnirelmann category (or, Lusternik–Schnirelmann category, LS-category) of a topological space  is the homotopy invariant defined to be the smallest integer  number  such that there is an open covering  of  with the property that each  inclusion map  is nullhomotopic. For example, if  is a sphere, this takes the value two.

Sometimes a different normalization of the invariant is adopted, which is one less than the definition above. Such a normalization has been adopted in the definitive monograph by Cornea, Lupton, Oprea, and Tanré (see below).

In general it is not easy to compute this invariant, which was initially introduced by Lazar Lyusternik and Lev Schnirelmann in connection with variational problems. It has a close connection with algebraic topology, in particular cup-length.  In the modern normalization, the cup-length is a lower bound for the LS-category.

It was, as originally defined for the case of  a manifold, the lower bound for the number of critical points that a real-valued function on  could possess (this should be compared with the result in Morse theory that shows that the sum of the Betti numbers is a lower bound for the number of critical points of a Morse function).

The invariant has been generalized in several different directions (group actions, foliations, simplicial complexes, etc.).

See also
 Ganea conjecture
 Systolic category

References

 Ralph H. Fox, On the Lusternik-Schnirelmann category, Annals of Mathematics 42 (1941), 333–370.
 Floris Takens, The minimal number of critical points of a function on compact manifolds and the Lusternik-Schnirelmann category, Inventiones Mathematicae 6 (1968), 197–244.
 Tudor Ganea, Some problems on numerical homotopy invariants, Lecture Notes in Math. 249 (Springer, Berlin, 1971), pp. 13 – 22    
 Ioan James, On category, in the sense of Lusternik-Schnirelmann, Topology 17 (1978), 331–348.
Mónica Clapp and Dieter Puppe, Invariants of the Lusternik-Schnirelmann type and the topology of critical sets, Transactions of the American Mathematical Society 298 (1986), no. 2, 603–620.
 Octav Cornea, Gregory Lupton, John Oprea, Daniel Tanré, Lusternik-Schnirelmann category, Mathematical Surveys and Monographs, 103. American Mathematical Society, Providence, RI, 2003  

Algebraic topology
Morse theory